Polylepis besseri  is a species of plant in the family Rosaceae that is native to Bolivia and Peru.

References

External links
 
 

besseri
Trees of Bolivia
Trees of Peru